Ajaz is a male given name. Notable people with the name include:

 Ajaz Khowaj Quoram Ahmed (born 1973), British entrepreneur
 Ajaz Ahmed Khan, Indian politician
 Ajaz Akhtar (born 1968), Pakistani cricketer
 Ajaz Anwar (born 1946), Pakistani painter
 Ajaz Khan (born 1981), Indian actor
 Ajaz Patel (born 1988), New Zealand cricketer

Masculine given names